The men's individual recurve archery event at the 2010 Commonwealth Games was part of the archery programme and took place at the Yamuna Sports Complex.

Medalists

Ranking Round
38 archers competed.

Finals

Section 1

Section 2

Section 3

Section 4

References 

Archery at the 2010 Commonwealth Games